The 2009–10 FA Cup qualifying rounds opened the 129th season of competition in England for 'The Football Association Challenge Cup' (FA Cup), the world's oldest association football single knockout competition. As in the previous year, 762 clubs were accepted for the competition.

The large number of clubs entering the tournament from lower down (Levels 5 through 10) in the English football pyramid meant that the competition started with six rounds of preliminary (2) and qualifying (4) knockouts for these non-League teams. The 32 winning teams from the Fourth Round Qualifying progressed to the First round proper, where League teams tiered at Levels 3 and 4 entered the competition.

Calendar and prizes
The calendar for the 2009–10 FA Cup qualifying rounds, as announced by The Football Association.

Extra preliminary round
The draw for the extra preliminary round was announced on The FA's website on 1 July. Matches in this round were played on the weekend of 15 August 2009, with replays played between 17 and 19 August 2009. 406 clubs from Level 9 and Level 10 of English football, entered at this stage of the competition.

Preliminary round
Preliminary Round fixtures were played on the weekend of 29 August 2009. A total of 334 clubs took part in this stage of the competition, including the 203 winners from the extra preliminary round and 131 entering at this stage from the six leagues at Level 8 of English football (all except Leyton from Isthmian League Division One North). The round featured 50 clubs from Level 10 still in the competition, being the lowest ranked teams in this round.

First Round Qualifying
The First Round Qualifying fixtures were played on the weekend of 12 September 2009, with replays being played the following mid-week. A total of 232 clubs took part in this stage of the competition, including the 167 winners from the preliminary round and 65 entering at this stage from the top division of the three leagues at Level 7 of English football, while Halesowen Town from Southern League Premier Division was barred from FA Cup because of financial difficulties. The round featured 17 clubs from Level 10 still in the competition, being the lowest-ranked clubs in this round.

As Newcastle Blue Star folded after the draw took place, Ossett Albion were given a walkover to the Second Round Qualifying.

Bobby Traynor was voted Player of the Round for his hat-trick in Kingstonian's 4–1 win against Bognor Regis Town.

Second Round Qualifying
The Second Round Qualifying fixtures were played on the weekend of 26 September 2009. A total of 160 clubs took part in this stage of the competition, including the 116 winners from the First Round Qualifying and 44 Level 6 clubs, from Conference North and Conference South, entering at this stage. AFC Wulfrunians, Bardon Hill Sports, East Preston, Gillingham Town and Jarrow Roofing BCA from Level 10 of English football, were the lowest-ranked clubs to qualify for this round of the competition.

Third round Qualifying
The Third Round Qualifying took place on the weekend of 10 October 2009. A total of 80 clubs took part, all having progressed from the Second Round Qualifying. Aylesbury and Coventry Sphinx from Level 9 of English football were the lowest-ranked clubs to qualify for this round of the competition.

Fourth round Qualifying
The Fourth Round Qualifying took place on the weekend of 24 October 2009. A total of 64 clubs took part, 40 having progressed from the Third Round Qualifying and 24 clubs from Conference Premier, forming Level 5 of English football, entering at this stage. Aylesbury from Level 9 of English football was the lowest-ranked club to qualify for this round of the competition.

Competition proper

Winners from the Fourth Round Qualifying advanced to the First Round Proper, where clubs from Level 3 and Level 4 of English football, operating in The Football League, first enter the competition. See 2009–10 FA Cup for competition details from the First Round Proper onwards.

References

External links
 Football Club History Database: FA Cup 2009-10
 The FA Cup Archive

Qualifying
FA Cup qualifying rounds